The 1974 Soviet First League was the fourth season of the Soviet First League and the 34th season of the Soviet second-tier league competition.

Final standings

Number of teams by union republic

See also
 Soviet First League

External links
 1974 season. RSSSF

1974
2
Soviet
Soviet